"Bob Day Afternoon" is the second episode of the second season of the animated comedy series Bob's Burgers and the overall 15th episode, and is written by Dan Fybel and Rich Rinaldi and directed by Wes Archer. It aired on Fox in the United States on March 18, 2012.

Plot
After a bit of role-play training at home, Bob goes across the street to the bank in order to ask for a loan, despite having fairly low credit scores and several outstanding loans with them already. Upon arriving at the bank, he is rejected by his mean and rude bank teller, who doesn't treat him as a client, and even encourages mocking Bob for his low credit scores. Upon returning to Bob's Burgers, Bob sees several police cars, followed by a SWAT team and a series of news vans, heading back towards the bank. A police detective enters their store, announcing that there is a holdup and hostage situation in progress in the bank, and that he needs Bob's Burgers to act as a headquarters for the police response.

The bank robber Mickey (voiced by Bill Hader) requests pizza, and much to Bob's dismay and disgust Jimmy Pesto takes the opportunity to deliver it to them, gaining free publicity in the process. The pizza is delivered by a remote control robot, and Gene asks the operator where he received his training, leading to an extended fantasy about attending Robot College, where he is seen partying and streaking with robots.

Bob is overjoyed when Mickey dislikes Pesto's pizza, declaring it the worst Italian pizza, and asks for burgers instead. He speaks to Bob, and requests that he deliver the burgers himself. When Bob does so, the police sniper attempts to shoot Mickey, leading to Bob being taken hostage as well. A series of increasingly complicated group phone calls ensue between the police, the bank and the Belcher family, culminating in Bob being told that he should 'hit the deck' in one hour.

Before this can happen, Mickey is able to form the hostages around himself in a human shield and escape to Bob's Burgers, trading place with the police in the process. When an hour passes the bank is flooded by tear gas, incapacitating the police and giving Mickey his chance to escape. He takes it, but is caught in the process. Bob is almost offered a loan from the teller, but an ink packet explodes in his pocket, revealing money was hidden there. Bob  tries to say Mickey put the money in his pocket, but no one believes him. The episode ends with Mickey calling the family from jail, and is still on good terms with them all.

Reception
The episode received a 2.1 rating and was watched by a total of 4.40 million people. This made it the fourth most watched show on Animation Domination that night, beating The Cleveland Show, but losing to American Dad!, The Simpsons and Family Guy with 5.61 million. Rowan Kaiser of The A.V. Club gave the episode an A−, saying "Bob Day Afternoon" is also structured to build and maintain humor. Bob tries to get his loan restructured at the bank across the street, which starts the episode off on a simple, strong emotional core. Then a robber comes in and takes hostages, which builds tension, adds a bunch of stressed out characters, and makes the middle third of the episode about the difficulties of communication, which is traditional comic gold."

References

External links
 
 

2012 American television episodes
Bob's Burgers (season 2) episodes